The Battle of Tetovo, was the largest engagement during the 2001 insurgency in the Republic of Macedonia, in which Macedonian security forces battled Albanian insurgents of the National Liberation Army for control of the city.

Prelude
Tetovo is a large city in Macedonia, the majority of whose citizens are ethnic Albanians.
During the break up of Yugoslavia in the 1990s, over 2,000 ethnic Albanians marched through Tetovo demanding secession from the Socialist Republic of Macedonia and unity with Albania. Self-determination of an ethnic minority within a state was not a right under the Socialist Republic of Macedonia's constitution, and protesting their lack of representation under the constitution of a new Republic of Macedonia, the Albanians of Macedonia boycotted the referendum on independence from Yugoslavia and were thus excluded from almost any representation in the new government. Tetovo became headquarters of the new Albanian political parties, which were regarded as unconstitutional by the Republic of Macedonia. Tensions worsened, Tetovo, along with the city of Gostivar, took in and sheltered several thousands of Bosnian Muslim refugees from 1992 until the end of the Bosnian war. Prior to the NATO bombing of Yugoslavia over Kosovo, Tetovo became the rear supply base for the Kosovo Liberation Army, and then later home to over 100,000 Kosovar refugees from the Kosovo war. Gligorov's plan to re-allocate the Kosovar refugees to Albania via refugee corridor through Macedonia had been abandoned, and the refugees began to gather in Tetovo, Gostivar and the western Albanian dominated towns during the late summer months. The KLA began to use the Tetovo hospital to treat the wounded combatants. As the ethnic Albanian unofficial capital in Macedonia, Tetovo was crowded with refugees from Kosovo and was deeply involved in the munitions supply to the KLA.

The Albanian-dominated town of Tetovo had been deeply involved in the Kosovo war since the spring of 1998, and some leading KLA officials came from Tetovo, such as Bardhyl Mahmuti. Many educated Albanians in Tetovo under 50 years of age had attended Pristina University before it was purged of ethnic Albanian teachers in the early 1990s. Before 1991 Kosovo and Macedonia formed part of Yugoslavia which meant unrestricted access between the entities.

In 1997, Alajdin Demiri, the mayor of Tetovo, was jailed for raising the double headed eagle flag of Albania from Tetovo town hall and by 2000 the outbreak of hostilities in Tanusevci had spilled into the towns of Tetovo and Gostivar. With the formation of an insurgency, the National Liberation Front (NLA) began seizing territory in and around the Tetovo area. Skirmishes between the insurgency and government forces became commonplace in other portions of the country.

The Macedonian forces, numbering more than 3,000, held a limited amount of armour and artillery. Reportedly, they possessed a number of armoured personnel carriers, 105 mm and 122 mm Howitzers, ex-Bulgarian T-55 tanks. The bulk of their force consisted of reservists at the brink of conflict. These numbers were to rapidly rise in the following months as the military expenditures of Macedonia quadrupled to almost 7% of GDP,  which resulted in major purchases of military hardware mainly from Ukraine and Bulgaria, and the mobilisation of special police forces like the Lions and Tigers. By the height of the conflict, the whole 1st Mechanized Brigade was stationed in and around Tetovo municipality.

The NLA, a mainly guerrilla force, had only an assortment of rockets, assault weapons, and mortars. However, they had the advantage of concealed positions in the mountains ringing the city. Weapons and supplies found their way from Kosovo to the frontlines over the Šar Mountains through horse caravans. Mounts Baltepe and Kale were  major strongpoints, both of which held ancient fortresses left over from the Ottoman Empire. The rebels constructed a series of trenches and bunkers in defence.

Battle

Opening phase
During the afternoon of 14 March, ethnic Albanians held a nationalist rally in town. Around this time, machine gun fire opened up on Macedonian police from the Baltepes hill. The confrontation in Tetovo began when about 15 rebels opened fire with rifles in the suburb of Kale about 1.2 miles north of the city centre and in the nearby village of Selce. The NLA proceeded to engage Macedonian forces with sniper fire and mortar attacks.

The first civilian death was an Albanian taxi driver who was killed on the first day of the rebellion in the old Ottoman neighbourhood of Koltuk when the police opened fire with machine guns indiscriminately, even though the main fighting at the time was taking place 1.2 miles away, beyond the Kale, the fortress above the city, in the village of Lavce.

Fifteen Macedonian police and a NATO German soldier were also wounded when joint barracks in the outskirts of the town where hit by mortar fire. The next day, the German Ministry of Defence moved in two Leopard 2 tanks from Prizren, in Kosovo, in order to protect the base. Half of the 1,200 German troops were evacuated to another location eight kilometers away. By 20 March, another 400 KFOR German combat troops equipped with Marder armoured vehicles and more Leopard II tanks had been deployed to Tetovo. Civilians continued on with their daily business, but the streets became empty. Cafes and shops were deserted and electricity was cut off to part of the town. For the cafes that remained open, it was common to see some people taking the risk of watching gun battles.

In the battle for Tetovo, the Macedonian Army was frequently outmanoeuvred by the highly mobile guerrillas and their military leader, Gezim Ostreni. Born in Debar in western Macedonia, Ostreni was a veteran who had served in the Yugoslav Army and until April 2001 was a deputy commander in the Kosovo Protection Corps. Ostreni was typical of ethnic Albanians, who saw no future for themselves in the post-independence Macedonian Army whose officer corps was dominated by Macedonians.

On 21 March, the two sides witnessed a brief cease fire. The day was quiet without a single shot. By this point in time, however, thousands of residents had fled the city. Those whom remained pressed on with life as best as they could while both factions licked their wounds. It was also on this day that the Macedonian army scaled Kale Hill under cover of artillery and gunfire.

On 22 March, after two months of sporadic violence, two Albanians were gunned down near the football stadium in the eastern districts. The two men approached a Macedonian checkpoint in a white car, and tossed a device to the policemen. The men were shot immediately. Western and Albanian media reported that Macedonian forces mistook a cellphone for an explosive device, though it was later established that it was, indeed, a hand grenade. Images of the dead men became famous, marking the insurgency's first martyrs and bringing Macedonia's violence to the world spotlight.

The Macedonians proceeded to beef up their security forces and deployed T-55 tanks in support.

In Tetovo's old town, a sandbag checkpoint near the Church of St. Nicholas suffered frequent shelling from houses in the highlands. Over the next few days, several skirmishes broke out throughout the hills. A Macedonian Mi-17 helicopter crashed while ferrying police forces to a ski resort on the outskirts of town, killing the pilot and wounding 16 policemen. Most of the rebels held out on Baltepe Mountain. From the Koltak district, Macedonian forces poured fire onto Albanian positions. This was often returned with machine gun, sniper, and mortar fire.

A series of blasts was clearly visible in the hills above Tetovo as terrified residents scurried for cover below. The hills had been occupied by Albanian guerrilla forces for the past week. The Macedonian army was firing indiscriminately and several of the rising columns of smoke came from civilian houses. There was no word on casualties, but the risk to civilians was high. The hills around Tetovo are dotted with houses and it was not clear if they had all been evacuated. The NLA stood their ground.

A short time after the start of the Government offensive, the Macedonian army issued an ultimatum, giving the NLA 24 hours to cease hostilities and surrender, or leave Macedonia. After the deadline, Macedonian security forces continued using all their means against positions of the rebels. The Macedonian onslaught began just hours after the rebels offered to join peace talks.

Staunch resistance by 100 NLA fighters cornered in the Gracani area after the Tetovo fighting continued to harass the ARM, whose infantry units seemed extremely reluctant to engage in an open battle.

Operation MH 

Operation MH was the first Macedonian offensive planned and executed to clear out the rebels after weeks of skirmishes with the NLA. It began on March 25 with a combined assault by Macedonian Army and Police forces in the city of Tetovo and the surrounding villages which resulted with the routing of NLA forces and their removal from the Tetovo area, the NLA called it a tactical retreat. The offensive ended two days later with the Macedonian security forces taking control of the city, the fortified medieval fortress and the surrounding villages.

Vejce Ambush 

Macedonian Army soldiers were attacked near the village of Vejce, nine miles north of Tetovo. Stevo Pendarovski, the Interior Ministry spokesman, said Eight are killed and two are injured. They were fired at with machine guns and rocket launchers. Macedonian forces responded, and the attackers withdrew. The situation is quiet now. It was an isolated incident. The assumption was premature. The slaying of the eight commandos, which was an enormous loss for a country of only two million people, provoked the first civilian backlash by Macedonians grouped in sinister new paramilitary style, 'self-defence' organisations in the southern city of Bitola, 170 kilometres (120 miles) south of Skopje, from where four of the dead soldiers came. Ethnic Macedonian crowds looted and set fire to Albanian shops.

Second phase
On 6 June another cease-fire was initiated, which lasted eighteen days before being broken by the NLA. Just before noon on 22 July, machine gun and small arms fire shattered the silence once again. As United States and European envoys met with President Boris Trajkovski in Skopje on 23 July, the battle reached Tetovo's suburbs.

On 23 July, the Macedonians used ex-Ukrainian Mi-24 helicopters for the first time in the conflict, responding to Albanian mortar fire that wounded 20 civilians in the Koltuk area. Despite the addition of these new helicopters and superior firepower, the army was not experienced at counterinsurgency operations and resorted to sledgehammer tactics. With the hills and mountains behind the city and dozens of Albanian-populated villages to count on for support, the rebels knew they were in a strong position in Tetovo.

On 24 July the Macedonian government issued an ultimatum demanding the NLA retreat from their positions in Tetovo and the villages which they took during the ceasefire or face an all out attack. The rebel's abuse of the NATO brokered ceasefire to gain territory and the international observers criticizing of the Macedonian government for using disproportionate force against the rebels prompted the Macedonian government to accuse NATO of siding with the rebels.

The NLA would continue to abuse ceasefires to gain ground in the north of Tetovo as Harald Schenker in a report for OSCE would state: {{Blockquote|"The OSCE was in danger of becoming the object of the tensions within the crisis government, particularly as it had no mandate, let alone the power to prevent or even stop the territorial gains that the UCK/ NLA had made in the area north of Tetovo in clear violation of the ceasefire.}}

In the Drenovac district, rebels and government forces fought heavily for the town's sports stadium. The fall of the stadium and government checkpoint left the rebels within fifty yards of the city center. Residents of the areas were instructed to leave their homes by Macedonian forces.

During the fierce fighting that engulfed Tetovo from 22 to 24 July, a 12-year-old Albanian girl, Jehina Saliu, was mortally wounded in Poroj. The shelling of Poroj killed nine civilians on 23 July alone. Jeff Bieley, a journalist who was covering the conflict, found himself trapped in a basement in the village during the bombardment. It was held by the NLA in as much as police could not go there, he recalled, 'but it was mainly a civilian target.' Thirteen civilians and five government soldiers were injured. Macedonian government forces also shelled villages surrounding Tetovo, which were under control of Albanian rebels.

On July 25 things in the city calmed down as the rebels were fortifying their positions

On July 26 the NLA agreed to pull back to their original positions before the ceasefire amid Macedonian government threats that refusal would lead to a full scale offensive in a new NATO brokered ceasefire

On July 30 the Macedonian government accused the rebels of violating the new ceasefire by staying at the positions they captured during the past week which the NLA denied but was confirmed by international observers who spotted the Rebels in uniform and civilian clothing. This prevented the return of the Macedonian refugees that had left the villages during the fighting. International observers also witnessed ethnic Macedonian homes being set alight by the NLA in the village of Tearce.

Final phase
The Ohrid peace negotiations finally came into play on 8 August. By then, Tetovo was practically a ghost city, most of its residents having fled the fighting. On 12 August 2001, ten ethnic Albanians in the village of Ljuboten were killed by government forces – evidently in revenge for the slaying of eight Macedonian commandos blown up by land mines and ten other soldiers killed in an NLA ambush. The eight soldiers were killed, and eight others were wounded, on the morning of 10 August, when a Macedonian military truck ran over two anti-tank mines on a remote country road on the Skopska Crna Gorna mountain just north of Skopje.

Ljuboten also gave an international profile for the first time to Ljube Boskovski, the hardline Interior Minister who is a hero to many ordinary Macedonians but a simple-minded warlord in the eyes of many ethnic Albanians. President Trajkovski dismissed the Macedonian Army Chief of Staff, General Pande Petrovski, on 9 August, following the attack on the convoy. Petrovski had told Macedonia's National Security Council that he 'would take responsibility' for the casualties. His deputy, General Metodij Stamboliski, replaced him. This was the fourth time that the armed forces command had changed hands in less than two months, another telling sign of the Macedonian Army's inability to cope with the rebellion.

The next day, the rebels attacked Macedonian army barracks in central Tetovo, sending black plumes of smoke above the northern and southwestern suburbs. Part of the barracks and an armored personnel carrier were set on fire in the fighting. The NLA attacked the army barracks in the city of Tetovo with machine guns and grenade launchers, killing an army soldier. The Macedonian National Security Council, in response, authorized another offensive against the NLA. Macedonian forces concentrated their attack around the suburb of Teqe, of which a graveyard separated both factions.

Aftermath
On 13 August, Macedonian and Albanian representatives signed the Ohrid Agreement, ending most of the fighting. Over the next few months, NATO and Macedonian troops worked to disarm the NLA, which ceded power after the thirty-day Operation Essential Harvest.

As a result of the fighting, the Red Cross estimated that 76,000 people fled their homes. Though the major violence ended on the 13th, skirmishes and harassment remained common throughout the Tetovo area. On 14 August, A Macedonian policeman was shot dead by suspected ethnic Albanian rebels in Tetovo, puncturing the fragile ceasefire declared on Sunday as part of a plan to end the six-month rebellion and pave the way for the disarmament of the guerrilla National Liberation Army. An NLA commander said a civilian had been injured in the shooting at the Drenovec checkpoint in a Tetovo suburb. He accused police of opening fire.

A western ambassador in Skopje cautioned that NATO force would most likely remain for a while after the disarmament process as the Albanian youths have had a taste of a successful insurgency. Part of the guerrilla group feels very sure of itself and might not surrender its weapons.

On 12 November, three Macedonian police officers were ambushed and killed in the village of Trebos.

See also
Operation Essential Harvest
Operation MH - 2
Operation Vaksince
Prizren incident (1999)

References

Bibliography
 Diary of an Uncivil War, by Scott Taylor, Esprit de Corps Books (22 February 2002).
 Macedonia: Warlords and Rebels in the Balkans, by John Phillips, I.B. Tauris & Co Ltd, 2004.

External links
 Georgiev, Marko, "Tetovo, Macedonia, March 20, 2001: Apocalypse Now" (blog). Accessed 14 December 2010.
 "Rebel army on the hillsides", CNN (21 March 2001).
 Huggler, Justin (19 March 2001). "'My father was a fighter. It is in Albanian blood. I am not afraid. We will fight'", The Independent.
 Phillips, James T. (9 August 2001). "Report from Tetovo: The Road to War," NewsInsider.org. Accessed 14 December 2010.
 Seraphinoff, Michael (21 July 2002).  "Confronting Ethnic Cleansing in Tetovo, Macedonia," MakNews.com. Accessed 14 December 2010.
 Huggler (16 March 2001). "Albanian rebels take their battle to the streets," (originally in the Independent,) Peacelink.it listserve. Accessed 14 Dec 2010.
 "Battle for Tetovo rages", CNN (9 August 2001).
 "Mountain battle in Macedonia", CNN (22 May 2001).
 Kujundzic, Lidija. Trans. Lazovic, S. (23 March 2001) "Battle for Tetovo." Accessed 14 December 2010.
 "Attack choppers join Macedonian battle", CBC News (24 March 2001)
 Martin, Susan Taylor (22 March 2001). "Tetovo's residents watch, wait for war", St. Petersburg Times''.
 Deliso, Christopher (18 April 2002) "Macedonian Tortured in Tetovo Village, As Gang War Rages," antiwar.com. Accessed 14 December 2010.
 Deliso (25 January 2002) "On the Front Lines in Tetovo," antiwar.com. Accessed 14 December 2010.

Conflicts in 2001
Modern history of North Macedonia
2001 in the Republic of Macedonia
2001 insurgency in Macedonia
Battles involving Germany